The Government Medical College, Chandrapur was founded in 2015 in Chandrapur, Maharashtra, India. The college is affiliated to MUHS, Nashik and is under Director of Medical Education and Research (DMER), Mumbai. This college is wholly funded by Government of Maharashtra. MCI permission was granted in the year 2015.

The college was started in the premises of District T.B Hospital (100 beds). The District Civil Hospital (100 beds) and District T.B Hospital, both run by public health department of Maharashtra were merged.

A Cancer hospital will also be established in the campus by TATA Cancer Care Foundation and Government of Maharashtra.

Departments

Clinical 
 Department of Anaesthesia
 Department of Dentistry
 Department of ENT
 Department of Medicine
 Department of Ophthalmology
 Department of Obstetrics & Gynecology
 Department of Orthopedics 
 Department of Pediatrics
 Department of Psychiatry
 Department of Radiology
 Department of Skin & VD
 Department of General Surgery
 Department of Chest & TB

Pre-clinical 
 Department of Anatomy 
 Department of Physiology
 Department of Biochemistry

Para-clinical 
 Department of Pathology
 Department of Microbiology
 Department of Pharmacology
 Department of Forensic Medicine & Toxicology
 Department of Preventive & Social Medicine

Infrastructure overview 
Land area 
College building ground floor area  first floor area  second floor area 
College council hall 
Exam hall 
Canteen: Ground floor area  first floor area 131.28 square meters
Out Patient Department (OPD)
100 bedded T.B hospital building
100 bedded Civil hospital building
Auditorium with advanced sound system
Library with internet facility
Hostels for medical students and resident doctors
Gymnasium

Admissions 
The medical course of MBBS was started in the college with a total intake of 100 students in 2015. With the increase in the intake to 150 in the year 2019–20, there are a total of 500 students in the institute pursuing medical studies as of 2020. Admissions are made through CET / NEET (85% from state CET and 15% from central NEET).

See also 
Some other Government Medical Colleges (GMCs) nearby are:
 Government Medical College (Nagpur)
 Mahatma Gandhi Institute of Medical Sciences, Wardha
 Shri Vasantrao Naik Government Medical College, Yavatmal

References

External links
 HC booster shot for Chandrapur govt med college, orders 100 admissions

Medical colleges in Maharashtra
Chandrapur
Educational institutions established in 2015
2015 establishments in Maharashtra
Affiliates of Maharashtra University of Health Sciences